"Holy Cow" is a song written by Allen Toussaint and performed by Lee Dorsey.  It reached #6 on the UK Singles Chart, #10 on the U.S. R&B chart, and #23 on the U.S. pop chart in 1966.  It was featured on his 1966 album Working in the Coal Mine - Holy Cow.

The song was arranged Allen Toussaint and produced by Toussaint and Marshall Sehorn.

Other versions
Buddy Lucas released a version of the song on his 1967 album Honkin' Sax.
The Shadows released a version of the song on their 1967 album From Hank, Bruce, Brian and John.
The Band released a version of the song on their 1973 album Moondog Matinee.
Mike Finnigan released a version of the song on his 1976 album Mike Finnigan.
Kingfish released a version of the song their 1985 album Alive in Eighty Five.
Oily Rags released a version of the song on their 1985 album Oily Rags.
Jools Holland released a version of the song as a single in 1990 with Vic and Bob (Vic Reeves and Bob Mortimer) on backing vocals, but it did not chart.

References

1966 songs
1966 singles
1990 singles
Songs written by Allen Toussaint
Lee Dorsey songs
The Shadows songs
The Band songs
Chas & Dave songs
I.R.S. Records singles